Mammadali Nazim oglu Mammadov (born 1 February 1983) better known as DJ Fateh,  is an Azerbaijani producer, television presenter, DJ. He is director of İctimai Radio since 2018.

Biography 
DJ Fateh was born on 1 February 1983, in Baku. He studied at school No. 42 between 1990 and 2000. In 2000 he entered the Azerbaijan State Oil Academy.

He is host of Brain Ring intellectual show since 2013.

DJ Fateh currently works in İctimai Television and İctimai Radio.

Awards  
 Taraggi Medal

Filmography 
 Vəkil hanı? (2011)
 Oğlan Evi: Azərbaycansayağı qarət (2015)
 Oğlan evi 2 (2016)

References

External links 
 

Living people
1983 births
Azerbaijani television presenters